Lee Ok-Sung (born February 7, 1981 in Jinju, Gyeongsangnam-do, South Korea) is a South Korean amateur boxer best known for winning the 2005 World Amateur Boxing Championships in the men's flyweight division.

Career
Lee is relatively tall for a flyweight (170 cm).
At the 2005 World Championships In Mianyang, China, he beat young southpaw Rau'shee Warren to set up his championship final.
In the finals he defeated Cuban Andry Laffita who had beaten Somjit Jongjohor (THA) and Jérôme Thomas (FRA). He became the first South Korean amateur boxer to win a gold medal at the World Amateur Boxing Championships since 1986 when Moon Sung-Kil won the gold in Reno, United States.

At the 2006 Asian Games Lee just as surprisingly lost to Yang Bo of China in the quarterfinals, and his winning streak in international competition ended at 28 games.

He did not participated in the national trials for the 2007 World Championships in order to complete his master's degree.

In the first round of the 2008 Olympic Games Lee reached the second round.

Results

2005 World Championships

2008 Summer Olympics

External links
 Profile
 

1981 births
Living people
People from Jinju
Flyweight boxers
Boxers at the 2008 Summer Olympics
Olympic boxers of South Korea
Sportspeople from South Gyeongsang Province
Boxers at the 2006 Asian Games
South Korean male boxers
AIBA World Boxing Championships medalists
Asian Games competitors for South Korea